"Rebound" is a song by American indie rock band Sebadoh, from their 1994 album Bakesale.  It was released as a CD Single and 7" vinyl record.

A solo acoustic version appears as a b-side on the song's US single, and on the 2011 Bakesale reissue.

A music video was made for the song.

Track listing
US CD Single (SP284b)
"Rebound"
"Social Medicine"
 "On Fire (acoustic)"
 "Magnet's Coil (acoustic)"
 "Rebound (acoustic)"

UK 7" Single (RUG17)
"Rebound"
"Careful"

Sebadoh songs
1994 singles
Sub Pop singles
1994 songs
Songs written by Lou Barlow